Lelia Naylor Morris (April 15, 1862July 23, 1929) was an American Methodist hymnwriter. Some sources give her first name as Leila, but her obituary, grave marker, and other sources give her name as Lelia. She is sometimes known as Mrs. Charles H. Morris, as (Mrs.) C. H. Morris, or as (Mrs.) C. H. M., having adopted her husband's forenames upon marriage after the custom of the time.

Biography
Morris was born in Pennsville, Ohio. While still a child, she moved with her family to Malta, OH. Later, she and her sister and her mother ran a millinery shop in McConnelsville, OH. In 1881, she married Charles H. Morris. The couple were active in the Methodist Episcopal Church, and attended camp meetings at places such as Old Camp Sychar, Mount Vernon, OH and Sebring Camp, Sebring, OH. In the 1890s, she began to write hymns and gospel songs; it has been said that she wrote more than 1,000 songs and tunes, and that she did so while doing her housework.

Around 1928, she and her husband moved to live with their daughter in Auburn, NY, where she died. She is buried in McConnelsville Cemetery, McConnelsville, OH.

Songs 

 "Are You Looking For The Fullness"
 "Bring Your Vessels, Not a Few", 1912
 “Can the World See Jesus in You”
 "Called unto Holiness"
 "For A Worldwide Revival" 
 "For God So Loved This Sinful World"
 "Fully Surrendered To Jesus The Lord"
 "Hallelujah for the Blood"
 "Holiness Unto the Lord", 1900
 "Hymn, to Fight!"
 "I Know God's Promise is True", 1899
 "Let All the People Praise Thee", 1906
 "My Stubborn Will at Last Hath Yielded"
 "Nearer, Still Nearer", 1898
 "Sanctifying Power", 1908
 "Sweet Will of God", 1900
 "Sweeter as the Years Go By", 1912
 "The Fight is on" circa 1905
 "The Stranger of Galilee"
 "'Tis Marvelous and Wonderful"
 "Victory all the Time", 1901
 "Let Jesus Come into Your Heart"

Notes

References 

1862 births
1929 deaths
People from Morgan County, Ohio
American Christian hymnwriters
American Methodist hymnwriters
Songwriters from Ohio
American women hymnwriters
People from McConnelsville, Ohio
People from Malta, Ohio